Tribasodites thailandicus is a species of beetles first found in Chiang Mai, Thailand.

References

Staphylinidae
Beetles described in 2015
Insects of Thailand